Avraham Aviv Alush (born ) is an Israeli actor, musician, model, and television host. best known as Amos Dahari "The Baker"  in the Israeli series Beauty and the Baker, and as Jesus in the American film The Shack (2017). He also played a leading role in the Israeli series Valley of Tears (2020).

Early life
Alush was born in Kiryat Bialik, Israel, to a family of both Sephardic Jewish (Tunisian-Jewish) and Mizrahi Jewish (Yemenite-Jewish) descent. He grew up in Karmiel, Israel, with his younger sister Reut Alush, who is also an actress.

Alush was enlisted as an Infantry combat soldier in the Golani Brigade of the Israeli Defence Forces, where he served from 2000 to 2003.

Career

Acting
In 2012 he was cast as a series regular in the Ran Danker-starring psychological series, The Gordin Cell. 
In 2013 he began appearing in Beauty and the Baker alongside Rotem Sela. In Israel the series was positively reviewed by Haaretz newspaper. In 2017 Amazon acquired global rights of the first two seasons of the show to stream them worldwide on Amazon Prime Video.

Prior to his role in the American film The Shack in 2017, he had only played in Israeli films and television. With the making of this film, he is also the first Israeli actor to play Jesus in an English-language film.

He has also appeared as a stage actor, appearing in the Habima Theater production of Dangerous Liaisons in 2016. He previously appeared in the theater's 2012 production of The Merchant of Venice where he played Gratiano.

Modeling
He has appeared in fashion advertising campaigns for FILA and Castro.

Music
In 2018 he collaborated with Elai Botner on the single,“Hachi Karov Elayeich” (“Closest to You”) with Tablet magazine naming it the “Hottest Israeli Song of the Summer” In March 2019 the duo released a new single and music video

Personal life
In 2011, he married Israeli lawyer Nofar Koren, with whom he has four children. They resided in Tel Aviv, Israel.
During the coronavirus pandemic he moved with his family to a farm in northern Israel near Mount Meron. In 2021, Alush had declared that he became more religious.

Filmography
Selected films and television:
The Island (TV) (2007) 
The Arbitrator (TV) (2007)
Asfur (TV) (2010-2011)
Alenby (TV) (2012) 
The Gordin Cell (TV) (2012-2015)
Beauty and the Baker (TV) (2013-2021)
The Red Hood Setup (2014)
An Israeli Love Story (2016)
The Women's Balcony (2016)
The Shack (2017)
  Valley of tears (שעת נעילה) TV (2020)

References

External links
 

1982 births
Living people
People from Karmiel
Israeli male film actors
Jewish Israeli male actors
Israeli male television actors
21st-century Israeli male singers
Israeli male models
Jewish male models
21st-century Israeli male actors
Israeli people of Tunisian-Jewish descent
Israeli people of Yemeni-Jewish descent
Israeli Sephardi Jews
Israeli Mizrahi Jews